The European e-commerce VAT directive (2002/38/EC from 7 May 2002) is a directive in the European Union which regulates value added tax of sales to consumers in EU and EEA countries.

A consequence of the directive is the Norwegian VAT On E-Commerce (VOEC) scheme, which was implemented in Norway starting in 2020. To avoid a customs clearance fee, foreign webshops selling goods to consumers in Norway need to register in the VOEC registry of the Norwegian Tax Administration.

See also 
 Import One-Stop Shop (IOSS), an EU-wide scheme with similarities to the VOEC

References

External links 
 Official list of stores and marketplaces registered in the VOEC - The Norwegian Tax Administration
 Official information on VOEC - The Norwegian Tax Administration (English)

Socioeconomics
Tax
E-commerce